Wilfred Wood VC (2 February 1897 – 3 January 1982) was an English recipient of the Victoria Cross, the highest and most prestigious award for gallantry in the face of the enemy that can be awarded to British and Commonwealth forces.

The VC was awarded for action on the Italian front against Austro-Hungarian forces in the First World War.

Details
He was 21 years old, and a private in the 10th Battalion, The Northumberland Fusiliers, British Army during the First World War when the following deed took place at the battle of Vittorio Veneto for which he was awarded the VC.

For most conspicuous bravery and initiative on 28 October 1918, near Casa Van, Italy, when a unit on the right flank having been held up by hostile machine guns and snipers, Pte. Wood, on his own initiative, worked forward with his Lewis gun, enfiladed the enemy machine-gun nest, and caused 140 enemy to surrender.

The advance was continued till a hidden machine gun opened fire at point blank range. Without a moment's hesitation Pte. Wood charged the machine gun, firing his Lewis gun from the hip at the same time. He killed the machine-gun crew, and without further orders pushed on and enfiladed a ditch from which three officers and 160 men subsequently surrendered.

The conspicuous valour and initiative of this gallant soldier in the face of intense rifle and machine-gun fire was beyond all praise.

After the war, he returned to his pre-war job on the railways, first as a Fireman, then as an engine driver. He retired in 1960 as a supervisor.

A LNWR Claughton Class locomotive was named after him in 1922. When this type was withdrawn from service, a London, Midland and Scottish Railway Patriot Class steam locomotive was named after him, from which the nameplate resided inside Norbury Primary School in Hazel Grove until it was donated to the Fusiliers Museum of Northumberland.

The JD Wetherspoon pub in Hazel Grove is named after him.

See also
Monuments to Courage (David Harvey, 1999)
The Register of the Victoria Cross (This England, 1997)

References

External links
Location of grave and VC medal (Manchester)
Up the Line Western Front Association

1897 births
1982 deaths
People from Stockport
British World War I recipients of the Victoria Cross
Royal Northumberland Fusiliers soldiers
British Army personnel of World War I
Italian front (World War I)
British train drivers
British Army recipients of the Victoria Cross
Military personnel from Cheshire